Júdás is a 1918 Hungarian film directed by Michael Curtiz to a script by Iván Siklósi. It stars Gyula Gál, Lajos Kemenes, Leopold Kramer.

References

External links

1918 films
Films directed by Michael Curtiz
Hungarian black-and-white films
Hungarian silent films